Misfits is the seventeenth studio album by the English rock band the Kinks, released in 1978. Following the minor success of Sleepwalker in the United States, Misfits featured a more rock-oriented style than many other Kinks records of the 1970s. Despite internal conflicts within the band, leading to both bassist Andy Pyle and pianist John Gosling quitting the band, the album made the Top 40 in America. The album also contained the minor hit single "A Rock 'n' Roll Fantasy", as well as less successful releases "Live Life" and "Black Messiah".

Background
Misfits was the second album the band recorded for Arista Records, the record company the band switched to from RCA Records in 1976. Although the band had spent a good portion of the 1970s releasing concept albums, their previous album, Sleepwalker, signaled a shift toward more rock based material. In addition, the album began the band's commercial comeback in the US, with the album reaching #21 and its title track peaking at #48. However, during the recording of Sleepwalker, longtime bassist John Dalton quit the band, and was replaced by Andy Pyle.

Recording
Many of the album's songs, such as "Hay Fever", "In a Foreign Land", and "Black Messiah", were leftovers from the band's previous 1977 album, Sleepwalker. "In a Foreign Land" (which featured Dalton on bass), specifically, was in the planned running order until late in recording. Instead it was replaced with the late addition "Mr. Big Man".

The album was recorded at Konk Studios in London following the band's tumultuous 1977 tour. Due to conflicts between Ray Davies and Pyle, the latter began contemplating leaving the band. Gosling, also wanting to leave the band since Dalton's resignation, began to work with Pyle over plans to form another band. However, when Ray Davies caught wind of the project, he began to intervene. Gosling remembered, "We [me and Pyle] rehearsed and held auditions at the Bridge House pub in Canning Town. It was exhilarating, like starting over. But Ray somehow found out and started giving me a hard time during my last overdub sessions for Misfits." After recording was done both Pyle and Gosling departed for good. Zaine Griff and Ron Lawrence did bass overdubs for some songs. In addition, founding drummer Mick Avory also considering leaving, and became a less active participant, leaving Dave Davies's friend Nick Trevisick to drum on three songs and session drummer Clem Cattini to do overdubs. However, Avory stayed with the band until 1984.

Release and reception
Although it was unable to chart in Britain, Misfits reached #40 in America. The debut single from the album, "A Rock 'n' Roll Fantasy", was also a minor hit in the US, reaching #30. Follow-up singles "Live Life" and "Black Messiah" (the latter a British-only release), however, failed to make an impact.

Track listing

On the UK version of the LP, a longer version of "Live Life" (4:47) switches places with "Black Messiah". Remastered CD releases have the UK LP track order and include a shorter "Live Life" as a bonus track (different from the US version). Arista released a ten track CD (Arista 260 173) that reproduces the original, non-UK LP version.

B-sides

Personnel
The Kinks
Ray Davies – vocals, guitar, piano, synthesizer
Dave Davies – lead guitar, vocals (lead vocals on "Trust Your Heart")
Mick Avory – drums, percussion (except as noted)
John Gosling – piano, organ, synthesizer
Andy Pyle – bass guitar (except as noted)

Other musicians
Nick Trevisik – drums on "Trust Your Heart", "A Rock & Roll Fantasy" and "Get Up"
John Dalton – bass guitar on “In A Foreign Land”
Ron Lawrence – bass guitar on “Live Life,” “Rock and Roll Fantasy,” and “Get Up”
Zaine Griff – bass guitar overdubs
Clem Cattini – drum overdubs
John Beecham – trombone on "Black Messiah"
Nick Newall – clarinet on "Black Messiah"
Mike Cotton – trumpet on "Black Messiah"

Production
Written and Produced by Raymond Douglas Davies
Engineered by Steve Waldman
Photography – James Wedge

References

Notes

Sources
 
 

1978 albums
The Kinks albums
Arista Records albums
Albums produced by Ray Davies